The Department of Environmental Affairs and Tourism was a department of the government of South Africa from 1994 to 2009.

Past Cabinet Ministers of Environmental Affairs and Tourism

After the election of President Jacob Zuma in May 2009 the department was divided into the Department of Environmental Affairs and the Department of Tourism.

Environmental Affairs and Tourism
South Africa, Environmental Affairs and Tourism
Environmental agencies in South Africa
Government agencies established in 1994
1994 establishments in South Africa
2009 disestablishments in South Africa